Michael Gary Koscheski is a United States Air Force major general who serves as the commander of Fifteenth Air Force since August 13, 2021. He most recently served as the deputy commander of the Ninth Air Force. In February 2021, he was assigned to become the commander of the Fifteenth Air Force, replacing Maj Gen Chad Franks.

References

External links

Living people
Year of birth missing (living people)
Place of birth missing (living people)
United States Air Force generals